In molecular biology, Small nucleolar RNA SNORD27 (also known as U27 in mammals and snR74 in fungi) is a member of the C/D class of snoRNA which contain the C (UGAUGA) and D (CUGA) box motifs. U27 is encoded within the U22 snoRNA host gene (UHG) in mammals and is thought to act as a 2'-O-ribose methylation guide for ribosomal RNA. This family also contains several related snoRNAs from yeast and plants.

References

External links 
 
 UMASS Yeast snoRNA page for snR74

Small nuclear RNA